Salvia patens, the gentian sage or spreading sage, is a species of flowering plant in the sage family Lamiaceae that is native to a wide area of central Mexico. This herbaceous perennial was introduced into horticulture in 1838 and popularized a hundred years later by the Irish gardener and botanist William Robinson (1838-1935).

Description
Salvia patens is tuberous, and easily lifted for overwintering in a greenhouse. Inflorescences reach  or longer, rising well above the leaves.  pure blue flowers are spaced along the inflorescence, with a  green calyx that adds to the attractiveness of the flowers.

The Latin specific epithet patens means "spreading".

Cultivation
Salvia patens is frequently treated as an annual by gardeners due to its sensitivity to hard frost, with bedding plants often put out in spring. Varieties have been developed with colors ranging from white to lilac to various shades of blue. Seeds from the Netherlands have been available since the 1990s for rich colored and large flowered varieties.

The species  and its cultivar 'Cambridge Blue' have gained the Royal Horticultural Society's Award of Garden Merit.

William Robinson praised the species in the 1933 edition of The English Flower Garden as, "doubtless, the most brilliant in cultivation, being surpassed by and equalled by few other [garden] flowers."

References

patens
Flora of Mexico
Garden plants of North America
Taxa named by Antonio José Cavanilles